Carrie Keranen is an American voice actress, production manager, producer and voice director. She is best known for her work with 4Kids Entertainment, Bang Zoom! Entertainment, DuArt Film and Video, NYAV Post, Studiopolis and Funimation. Her roles include Satsuki Kiryuin in Kill La Kill, Casca in Berserk, and Alya Césaire in Miraculous: Tales of Ladybug & Cat Noir. In her live-action work, she has played Piper Tate in Untitled Web Series About a Space Traveler Who Can Also Travel Through Time.

Career
Keranen grew up in Oak Park, Michigan. She had always been involved in acting, including high school plays, but in an interview with Everything Geek Podcast, she said she was more active in sports. She attended University of Michigan, and originally intended to major in international business with a specialization in Japanese but would be drawn back into doing plays and subbing in for major roles there. She graduated with a BA in theatre and linguistics, and after visiting Europe, moved to New York City to pursue acting. She worked on various acting jobs and did stand-up comedy. In 2003, she was a waitress at Rocco's which was featured in The Restaurant, a reality television series about the launch of celebrity chef Rocco DiSpirito's eatery. The series was broadcast on NBC for two seasons.

Keranen's first voice-over audition for 4Kids was April O'Neil in the 2003 TV series Teenage Mutant Ninja Turtles. She landed supporting roles, and also landed some guest and supporting voices on the Pokémon TV series. When fellow voice actress Tara Sands moved from New York to Los Angeles, she auditioned to voice match Sands' character Mokuba Kaiba in Yu-Gi-Oh!. On her way out of the audition, Keranen started pitching another voice actress for the part, but director Eric Stuart later told her that she was the right person for the role and that he even vouched for her to play the part. That was her first major role as a lead male character. Later in the same season, she also got to voice Kisara, which she said was more typical of the characters and used her natural voice. She also voiced Mina Simington, which she described as "type A but not in a forceful way" and would totally get into something if she had the chance.

In 2010, she moved to Los Angeles, California, to continue working on other projects. She had a recurring role as Kate Harper in the Fringe TV series, and is a member of the Sacred Fools Theater Company. On July 23, 2011, she and fellow voice actress Cristina Vee were panelists at Comic-Con for Namco Bandai's preview of the Tekken: Blood Vengeance film.

In 2014, Keranen voiced Satsuki Kiryuin, the student council president and antagonist in the anime series Kill la Kill, which ran on Cartoon Network's Adult Swim. In 2016, she provided the voice of Alya Césaire, Marinette Dupain-Cheng's best friend, in the French cartoon Miraculous: Tales of Ladybug & Cat Noir, which ran on Nickelodeon. She attended San Diego Comic-Con 2016 with the cast and the original creator, Thomas Astruc.

Filmography

Anime

Animation

Film

Video games

Live-action

References

 Interviews
 Carrie Keranen interview with Michael Rienas
 Carrie Keranen panel at Florida Supercon
 Carrie Keranen interview at Nan Desu Kan 2015 by Anime Hype
 Carrie Keranen interview at Everything Geek

External links
 
 
 Carrie Keranen at BroadwayWorld.com
 Carrie Keranen, Caroline Lawson, and Evelyn Lanto on Crystal Acids Voice Actor Database
 

Living people
21st-century American actresses
Actresses from Los Angeles
Actresses from Michigan
Actresses from New York City
American film actresses
American people of Finnish descent
American television actresses
American video game actresses
American voice actresses
Actors from Ann Arbor, Michigan
People from Oak Park, Michigan
People from Los Angeles
University of Michigan alumni
American voice directors
Participants in American reality television series
American web series actresses
Year of birth missing (living people)